Kushal Badrike (born July 20, 1977) is an actor and comedian from Maharashtra. He is well known for his comedy skits in Chala Hawa Yeu Dya.

Personal life 
Kushal married to Sunaina Badrike, a kathak dancer.

Career 
Kushal has started his career from Marathi plays like Jaago Mohan Pyare and Lali Leela. Some of his hit movies like Jatra, Maza Navra Tuzi Bayko, Huppa Huiyya, Bhaucha Dhakka, etc. He also played a role in a web series Struggler Saala. He participated in the comedy reality show Fu Bai Fu which was aired on Zee Marathi. Currently, he working in comedy talk show Chala Hawa Yeu Dya from 2014.

Filmography

Films 
 Friendship Dot Com -2006
 Jatra - 2006
 Waras Sarech Saras - 2006
 Bakula Namdeo Ghotale - 2007
 Majha Navra Tujhi Bayko - 2006
 Huppa Huiyya - 2010
 Davpech - 2010
 Bhaucha Dhakka - 2011
 Khel Mandala - 2012
 Eka Varchad Ek - 2012
 Ek Hota Kau - 2014
 Love Factor - 2014
 Bioscope - 2015
 Slam Book - 2015
 Barayan - 2018
 Loose Control - 2018
 Hichyasathi Kay Pan - 2018
 Gavthi - 2018
 Rampaat - 2019
 Zol Zaal - 2020
 Pandu - 2021
 Bhirkit - 2022

Television 
 Fu Bai Fu as various role
 Chala Hawa Yeu Dya as various role
 Shubham Karoti
 Malwani Days
 Tujhyat Jeev Rangala as Guest Appearance

Theater 
 Jaago Mohan Pyare
 Laali Leela

References

External links 
 Kushal Badrike on IMDb

Male actors in Marathi cinema
Living people
Male actors in Marathi theatre
Marathi actors
Indian male comedians
Year of birth missing (living people)
Male actors in Marathi television